Ernest Price (born September 20, 1950) is a former professional American football defensive lineman in the National Football League for seven seasons for the Detroit Lions and Seattle Seahawks. 

1950 births
Living people
American football defensive tackles
American football defensive ends
Texas A&M–Kingsville Javelinas football players
Detroit Lions players
Seattle Seahawks players